These are the official results of the men's 200 metres event at the 2007 IAAF World Championships in Osaka, Japan. There were a total number of 49 participating athletes, with six qualifying heats and the final held on Thursday August 30. This event is notable for being one of the two solo World Championship events in which Usain Bolt has been beaten as of July 2017, the other event being men's 200 metres in 2005 World Championships.

Medalists

Records
Existing records at the start of the event.

Schedule

Results

Heats
Qualification: First 4 in each heat(Q) and the next 8 fastest(q) advance to the quarterfinals.

Quarterfinals
Qualification: First 4 in each heat(Q)  advance to the semifinals.

Semifinals
First 4 of each Semifinal will be directly qualified (Q) for the final.

Semifinal 1

Semifinal 2

Final

References
 Results

Events at the 2007 World Championships in Athletics
200 metres at the World Athletics Championships